Megachile nigromixta is a species of bee in the family Megachilidae. It was described by Theodore Dru Alison Cockerell in 1919.

References

Nigromixta
Insects described in 1919